Gérard Rudolf (born 20 April 1966) is a South African actor and poet. He began his career in 1992 with the series Arende II.

Biography
Rudolf was born in Pretoria, South Africa. After completing high school in 1983 he did two years of compulsory military service. In 1987 he joined the Drama school at the University of Pretoria where he graduated in 1989. Rudolf's first language is Afrikaans, but he is also fluent in English.

He joined the CAPAB drama company for a year performing on stage in Shakespeare plays, comedies and dramas. He left the company in 1991 to start his own theater company called Makeshift Moon, specializing in original South African works. He received some notoriety as a gutsy actor and outspoken opponent to the Apartheid regime at the time, he also campaigned against forced military conscription.

It was also in 1991 that Rudolf developed an interest in film and appeared in roles over the next decade. In 1998, he became the head of drama at CityVarsity in Cape Town, a position he held until 2002.

Rudolf left Cape Town in 2002 and moved to the United Kingdom. However, he decided to return to South Africa in 2010 and now lives in Johannesburg.

As a poet, Rudolf published his first collection of poetic writings in 2009, titled Orphaned Latitudes. He is also a photographer.

Filmography 
Selected Filmography :

Bibliography

External links

References 
3. http://www.facebook.com/grudolfpics

South African male actors
Living people
1966 births
People from Pretoria
University of Pretoria alumni